Deutsche Schule Melbourne (DSM) is an accredited German School Abroad which opened its doors in 2008. The school offers bilingual education for primary school children up to Year 6 and is in North Fitzroy, a northern suburb of Melbourne, Victoria, Australia.

DSM is a member of Schools: Partners of the Future, an initiative of the German Federal Foreign Office.

History 
DSM was established in 2008 on the site of the former St. Joseph's College, which was the earliest founding school of Samaritan Catholic College.

School model 
Students at Deutsche Schule Melbourne grow up bilingually and biculturally, with German and English as the languages of instruction. Teaching is based on a one teacher-one language approach, in which teachers only conduct classes in their native-language, be it German or English. All teachers at DSM are bilingual in English and German and speak both languages fluently. The curriculum of Deutsche Schule Melbourne fulfills the requirements of both the Victorian Essential Learning Standards (VELS) and Thüringen curricula, ensuring an easy transition for those students who move to another Australian or German school. Students learn to read and write in German and English concurrently. In Year 1 and 2, 80% of classes are taught in German. The proportion of classes taught in English gradually increases so that by Year 6 it will amount to approximately 50% of teaching time. From 2025, Deutsche Schule Melbourne will expand into secondary education.

See also

 List of schools in Victoria
 German Australian

References

External links
 Deutsche Schule Melbourne official website

International schools in Melbourne
Primary schools in Melbourne
Educational institutions established in 2008
Melbourne
Fitzroy, Victoria
2008 establishments in Australia
Buildings and structures in the City of Yarra